Ranya is a town in the Kurdistan Region of Iraq, and is part of the Sulaymaniyah Governorate

References

External links

 Ranya Guide
  Raparin Administrator
 University of Raparin

Cities in Iraqi Kurdistan
Populated places in Sulaymaniyah Province
District capitals of Iraq
Kurdish settlements in Iraq